The Chief Minister of Jersey is the head of government of Jersey, leading the Council of Ministers, which makes up part of the Government of Jersey. The head of government is not directly elected by the people but rather by the legislature, the States Assembly.

The post was created by reforms to the machinery of government to change from a consensus style of government by committee of the whole States of Jersey to a system of cabinet government under a Chief Minister.

List of Chief Ministers

2000s
2005 election

The first chief minister of Jersey was elected on 5 December 2005 following the 2005 Jersey general election.

Two candidates were nominated on 1 December 2005:

Senator Stuart Syvret
Senator Frank Walker

In a secret ballot on Monday, 5 December 2005, the States of Jersey elected Senator Walker to be the first chief minister in Jersey history, receiving 38 votes to Senator Syvret's 14 votes of support, an unsurprising result for the latter who considered himself the underdog (a concern he had expressed during the preceding weekend in an interview with Channel Television).

2008 election

Senator Terry Le Sueur was elected chief minister on 8 December 2008 following the 2008 Jersey general election.

In a secret ballot, the States of Jersey voted for Senator Le Sueur with 36 votes. The only other challenger, Senator Alan Breckon, received 17 votes.

2010s
2011 election

Senator Ian Gorst was elected chief minister in an open ballot on 14 November 2011, beating Senator Sir Philip Bailhache 27 votes to 24. He nominated his preferred candidates for ministerial office on 16 November 2011, and took office as chief minister following the completion of elections of ministers on 18 November 2011.

2014 election

2018 election

Senator John Le Fondré was voted in as Jersey's fourth chief minister by 30 votes to 19, defeating Senator Ian Gorst who was looking to serve for a third term in the role. Gorst continued to serve on the Council of Ministers, taking over the external relations portfolio.

Senator Lyndon Farnham also declared an interest in standing as chief minister, but withdrew from the race to support Senator Le Fondré prior to the vote in the States Assembly - opting to remain as Minister for Economic Development instead.

2020s

2022 General Election

In January 2022, former Senator Sir Philip Bailhache announced he was seeking a return to front-line politics, and would stand as the Jersey Liberal Conservatives' candidate for Chief Minister if he was voted back in. He previously ran for the position in 2011.

The following month, the incumbent Chief Minister - Senator John Le Fondré - announced he would be standing as a candidate for the Jersey Alliance party. He wasn't however chosen as the party's candidate for leader, with members backing Sir Mark Boleat instead. It meant that even if Senator Le Fondré was successfully re-elected, he would only serve one term as Chief Minister.

In May, Senator Kristina Moore - who served as Home Affairs Minister during Ian Gorst's premiership - announced her intention to stand for Chief Minister if re-elected.

For the 2022 general election, the position of Senator was abolished and all candidates stood as Deputies or Constables. As Senators were the only position to be elected using an island-wide vote, they traditionally took on the Ministerial roles in Jersey's government. 2022 would be the first time a Chief Minister would be appointed without an island-wide mandate since the position was established in 2005.

Islanders went to the polls in June, with John Le Fondré's Alliance party suffering a bruising defeat - meaning neither he nor his party leader, Sir Mark Boleat, were in a position to stand for Chief Minister. Candidates aligned to political parties weren't as popular with the electorate as independent candidates, meaning Sir Philip Bailhache didn't have enough support from States Members to put himself forward.

The only party to increase the number of seats in the Assembly was Reform Jersey, which led Deputy Sam Mézec to announce his intention to stand as the party's candidate for Chief Minister.

On Friday 1st July, States Members elected Deputy Moore as Jersey's first female Chief Minister. Her picks for the Council of Ministers were all backed in the States Assembly, including retaining Ian Gorst as Treasury Minister.

See also
 List of current heads of government in the United Kingdom and dependencies

References

External links 

 Government of Jersey website

Government of Jersey